Tutu is an album by American jazz trumpeter Miles Davis, released in 1986 by Warner Bros. Records. It was recorded primarily at Capitol Studios in Los Angeles and Clinton Recording in New York, except the song "Backyard Ritual", which was recorded at Le Gonks in West Hollywood. Davis received the 1986 Best Jazz Instrumental Performance, Soloist Grammy Award for his performance on the album.

Background 
Originally some tracks were planned as a collaboration with Prince.  Prince later pulled out for undisclosed reasons, although the two remained firm friends and later collaborated on "Can I Play With U" as well.  (Davis later covered "Movie Star" and "Penetration" by Prince.)  Davis ultimately worked with bassist/multi-instrumentalist Marcus Miller. Miller wrote and arranged all the songs, except "Tomaas" (co-written by Davis), "Backyard Ritual" (by keyboardist George Duke), and "Perfect Way" (by pop group Scritti Politti). The music is strongly inspired by mid-1980s R&B and funk, with heavy use of synthesizers, sequencers and drum machines.

As indicated in the notes accompanying the album, Tutu was produced by Tommy LiPuma and Marcus Miller, with the exception of "Backyard Ritual", which was co-produced by Duke and LiPuma.

The cover was designed by Eiko Ishioka and photographed by Irving Penn. Eiko Ishioka received the 1987 Grammy Award for Best Album Package for her work as the art director. The original vinyl album featured a colored inner sleeve printed with the album credits on one side and a photograph of Davis's left hand (with middle finger depressed) on the reverse.

Reception and legacy 

Tutu divided critics and listeners when it was released in 1986. Like Davis's pivotal 1970 album Bitches Brew, Paul Tingen wrote, Tutu became one of the "defining jazz albums" of its decade and attracted a young, new audience while alienating many other jazz listeners because of its heavy reliance on the drum machine and synthesizers. A number of critics felt the music was ingratiatingly elegant, designed for casual listening, and largely a work by Miller. In The New York Times that year, Robert Palmer said it "already sounds curiously dated" and unambitious, featuring synthesizers that "have glutinous textures so overly familiar from the mainstream of late-1970s pop jazz" and electronic rhythms lacking the innovation of contemporary hip hop records.

Others believed the album gave a musical setting for Davis's improvisations to thrive in, comparable to his orchestral recordings with Gil Evans from the late 1950s and early 1960s. The Village Voice critic Robert Christgau deemed it a marginal success but also Davis's "best in a decade". He contended that while Davis's 1970s fusion recordings for Columbia Records were purely improvised jazz-rock, Tutu sounded "more like pop-funk Sketches of Spain, with the starperson's trumpet glancing smartly off an up-to-date panoply of catchy little tunes, beats, and rhythm effects". Jazz musician and writer Mike Zwerin was more enthusiastic, hailing it as "the best jazz record of the decade".

In a retrospective piece, Christgau later wrote that with "shlock" like Tutu and Amandla, Davis was taking advantage of the fusion movement he helped develop while showing "gratifying groove and class". In J. D. Considine's opinion, the album's compositions and improvisations endured well with the passage of time, even though its electronically processed and enigmatic music turned off jazz purists. Writing for Something Else! in 2006,  S. Victor Aaron said the best song from Tutu may have been Davis's own composition "Tomaas": "With a reggae beat married to repetitive single note underpinned by some very nifty bass work by Miller, Miles and Miller (also on soprano sax) trade fours and eights in a rare opportunity for Miles to stretch out. Overall, though, the trumpet playing is subdued, probably more constrained by production than declining abilities. Rarely does the mute come off his horn." Reviewing the album for Jazzwise in 2011, Davis' biographer George Cole said, "Tutu was a product of the 80s, a decade where music was often in danger of becoming subservient to technology. But while much of the music from this era is now long forgotten; Tutu continues to thrive; artists such as George Benson, Al Jarreau and Cassandra Wilson have recorded cover versions of the title track."

Between May and August 2010, Miller performed on the "Tutu Revisited" concert tour with a band comprising Christian Scott on trumpet with Alex Han on saxophone, Federico González Peña on keyboards and Louis Cato on drums. In an interview for JazzTimes, Miller said, "I'm finding that although the music mirrored the times in which it was created, there is so much in the music that still seems relevant today. Although we've replaced some of the super electro sounding elements, the melodies are still very cool. It feels like they have withstood the test of time. People seem to be feeling this music twenty years later."

Track listing
All tracks composed by Marcus Miller except where indicated:

"Tutu" – 5:15
"Tomaas" – 5:38 (Davis, Marcus Miller)
"Portia" – 6:18
"Splatch" – 4:46
"Backyard Ritual" – 4:49 (George Duke)
"Perfect Way" – 4:35 (David Gamson, Green Gartside)
"Don't Lose Your Mind" – 5:49
"Full Nelson" – 5:06

Deluxe edition 
Disc two (Live from Nice Festival, France, July 1986)
"Opening Medley": 'Theme from Jack Johnson', 'Speak', 'That's What Happened' – 15:14
"New Blues" – 5:20
"The Maze" – 10:15
"Human Nature" – 9:04
"Portia" – 7:54
"Splatch" – 17:10
"Time After Time" – 7:22
"Carnival" – 4:20

Personnel

Musicians 
 Miles Davis – trumpet
 Marcus Miller – all other instruments (1-4, 6, 7, 8), additional synthesizer programming, bass guitar (5)
 Jason Miles – synthesizer programming
 Adam Holzman – additional synthesizer programming, synthesizer solo (4)
 Bernard Wright – additional synthesizers (2, 7)
 George Duke – all other instruments (5)
 Omar Hakim – drums (2), percussion (2)
 Paulinho da Costa – percussion (1, 3, 4, 5)
 Steve Reid – additional percussion (4)
 Michał Urbaniak – electric violin (7)

Production 
 Tommy LiPuma – executive producer, producer 
 Marcus Miller – producer (1-4, 6, 7, 8), musical arrangements (1-4, 6, 7, 8)
 George Duke – producer (5), musical arrangements (5)
 Eric Calvi – engineer (1-4, 6, 7, 8), mixing (2, 6, 7, 8)
 Peter Doell – engineer (1-4, 6, 7, 8)
 Bill Schnee – mixing (1, 3, 4)
 Erik Zobler – engineer (5), mixing (5)
 Maureen Thompson – assistant engineer (1, 3, 4)
 Eddie Garcia – assistant engineer (2, 6, 7, 8)
 Doug Sax – mastering at The Mastering Lab (Hollywood, California)
 Larry Fishman – production assistant 
 Irving Penn – photography 
 Eiko Ishioka – art direction 
 Susan Welt – design

Charts

Certifications and sales

References

Bibliography

Further reading

External links 
 

1986 albums
Miles Davis albums
Albums produced by Tommy LiPuma
Albums produced by Marcus Miller
Jazz fusion albums by American artists
Jazz-funk albums
Warner Records albums
Albums recorded at Capitol Studios